In noncommutative geometry and related branches of mathematics and mathematical physics, a spectral triple is a set of data which encodes a geometric phenomenon in an analytic way.  The definition typically involves a Hilbert space, an algebra of operators on it and an unbounded self-adjoint operator, endowed with supplemental structures.  It was conceived by Alain Connes who was motivated by the Atiyah-Singer index theorem and sought its extension to 'noncommutative' spaces.  Some authors refer to this notion as unbounded K-cycles or as unbounded Fredholm modules.

Motivation 
A motivating example of spectral triple is given by the algebra of smooth functions on a compact spin manifold, acting on the Hilbert space of L2-spinors, accompanied by the Dirac operator associated to the spin structure.  From the knowledge of these objects one is able to recover the original manifold as a metric space: the manifold as a topological space is recovered as the spectrum of the algebra, while the (absolute value of) Dirac operator retains the metric.   On the other hand, the phase part of the Dirac operator,  in conjunction with the algebra of functions, gives a K-cycle which encodes index-theoretic information.  The local index formula expresses the pairing of the K-group of the manifold with this K-cycle in two ways: the 'analytic/global' side involves the usual trace on the Hilbert space and commutators of functions with the phase operator (which corresponds to the 'index' part of the index theorem), while the 'geometric/local' side involves the Dixmier trace and commutators with the Dirac operator (which corresponds to the 'characteristic class integration' part of the index theorem).

Extensions of the index theorem can be considered in cases, typically when one has an action of a group on the manifold, or when the manifold is endowed with a foliation structure, among others.  In those cases the algebraic system of the 'functions' which expresses the underlying geometric object is no longer commutative, but one may able to find the space of square integrable spinors (or, sections of a Clifford module) on which the algebra acts, and the corresponding 'Dirac' operator on it satisfying certain boundedness of commutators implied by the pseudo-differential calculus.

Definition 
An odd spectral triple is a triple (A, H, D) consisting of a Hilbert space H, an algebra A of operators on H (usually closed under taking adjoints) and a densely defined self adjoint operator D satisfying ‖[a, D]‖ < ∞ for any a ∈ A.  An even spectral triple is an odd spectral triple with a Z/2Z-grading on H, such that the elements in A are even while D is odd with respect to this grading.  One could also say that an even spectral triple is given by a quartet (A, H, D, γ) such that γ is a self adjoint unitary on H satisfying a γ = γ a for any a in A and D γ = - γ D.

A finitely summable spectral triple is a spectral triple (A, H, D) such that a.D for any a in A has a compact resolvent which belongs to the class of Lp+-operators for a fixed p (when A contains the identity operator on H, it is enough to require D−1 in Lp+(H)).  When this condition is satisfied, the triple (A, H, D) is said to be p-summable.  A spectral triple is said to be θ-summable when e−tD2 is of trace class for any t > 0.

Let δ(T) denote the commutator of |D| with an operator T on H.  A spectral triple is said to be regular when the elements in A and the operators of the form [a, D] for a in A are in the domain of the iterates δn of δ.

When a spectral triple (A, H, D) is p-summable, one may define its zeta function ζD(s) = Tr(|D|−s); more generally there are zeta functions ζb(s) = Tr(b|D|−s) for each element b in the algebra B generated by δn(A) and δn([a, D]) for positive integers n.  They are related to the heat kernel exp(-t|D|) by a Mellin transform.  The collection of the poles of the analytic continuation of ζb for b in B is called the dimension spectrum of (A, H, D).

A real spectral triple is a spectral triple (A, H, D) accompanied with an anti-linear involution J on H, satisfying [a, JbJ] = 0 for a, b in A.  In the even case it is usually assumed that J is even with respect to the grading on H.

Important concepts 
Given a spectral triple (A, H, D), one can apply several important operations to it.  The most fundamental one is the polar decomposition D = F|D| of D into a self adjoint unitary operator F (the 'phase' of D) and a densely defined positive operator |D| (the 'metric' part).

Metric on the pure state space 
The positive |D| operator defines a metric on the set of pure states on the norm closure of A.

Pairing with K-theory 
The self adjoint unitary F gives a map of the K-theory of A into integers by taking Fredholm index as follows.  In the even case, each projection e in A decomposes as e0 ⊕ e1 under the grading and e1Fe0 becomes a Fredholm operator from e0H to e1H.  Thus e → Ind e1Fe0 defines an additive mapping of K0(A) to Z.  In the odd case the eigenspace decomposition of F gives a grading on H, and each invertible element in A gives a Fredholm operator (F + 1) u (F − 1)/4 from (F − 1)H to (F + 1)H.  Thus u → Ind (F + 1) u (F − 1)/4 gives an additive mapping from K1(A) to Z.

When the spectral triple is finitely summable, one may write the above indexes using the (super) trace, and a product of F, e (resp. u) and commutator of F with e (resp. u).  This can be encoded as a (p + 1)-functional on A satisfying some algebraic conditions and give Hochschild / cyclic cohomology cocycles, which describe the above maps from K-theory to the integers.

See also
JLO cocycle

Notes

References
 
 
 
 
 

Noncommutative geometry